Juan Ramón Calvo Rodríguez (born 1 September 1982), commonly known as Juanra, is a Spanish futsal player who plays for ETO SZC Futsal Club as a midfielder.

Honours

1 League (01/02)
2 Supercopas de España (01/02,08/09)
1 Copa de España (08/09)
1 UEFA Futsal Cup (2009)
1 Madrid Cup (2006)
1 best winger LNFS (06/07)

References

External links
lnfs.es

1982 births
Living people
Sportspeople from Madrid
Spanish men's futsal players
Inter FS players
Xota FS players